Luis Manuel López Viera (born 12 September 1984) is a former Uruguayan professional footballer who played as a goalkeeper.

Career
López joined Torque in 2013. He made his professional debut on 12 October during a Uruguayan Segunda División draw with Villa Teresa, which was the first of ten appearances during 2013–14 as Torque finished bottom. In 2015, Huracán signed López but he failed to feature for their first-team.

In January 2017, López became a goalkeeping coach for Águila.

Career statistics
.

References

External links

1984 births
Living people
Footballers from Montevideo
Uruguayan footballers
Association football goalkeepers
Uruguayan Segunda División players
Montevideo City Torque players
Huracán F.C. players